Bob Chinn (born May 10, 1943) is a Chinese-American pornographic film director and actor. He is a member the AVN Hall of Fame and the XRCO Hall of Fame.

Born in Hawaii to immigrants from China who later settled in California, Chinn started his career circa 1970 after graduating from UCLA film school in 1966. He directed Candy Stripers, which is listed in the XRCO Hall of Fame.

He also created and directed the Johnny Wadd series of films featuring actor John C. Holmes. He made a total of 9 films with John Holmes in this series. Later, he was extensively interviewed in the documentary Wadd: The Life & Times of John C. Holmes.  In the 2000s, Chinn directed a new Johnny Wadd series which featured Joel Lawrence as Wadd.

Selected filmography

Johnny Wadd main series
 Johnny Wadd (1971)
 Flesh of the Lotus (1971)
 Blonde in Black Lace (1973) a.k.a. "Johnny Wadd & His 13 Calibur Weapon" in DVD release
 Tropic of Passion (1973)
 Liquid Lips (1976)
 Tell Them Johnny Wadd Is Here (1976)
 The Jade Pussycat (1977)
 The China Cat (1978)
 Blonde Fire (1978)

other Johnny Wadd films 
 The Danish Connection (1974), softcore film directed by Walt Davis
 Around the World with Johnny Wadd (1975), compilation of John Holmes scenes
 Tapestry of Passion (1976), directed by Alan Colberg
 The Return of Johnny Wadd (1986), directed by Patty Rhodes
 Re-enter Johnny Wadd (2001)
 Satin and Sabotage (2001), a.k.a. Johnny Wadd and the Sword of Charlemagne 1
 Silk and Seduction (2002), a.k.a. Johnny Wadd and the Sword of Charlemagne 2
 Passion and Betrayal (2002), a.k.a. Johnny Wadd and the Sword of Charlemagne 3

Others 
 Oriental Kitten (1975)
 Little Orphan Dusty (1978)
 Hot & Saucy Pizza Girls (1978)
 Disco Lady (1978)
 Tropic of Desire (1978)
 Prisoner of Paradise (1980)
 Baby Cakes (1983)
 Bad Penny (1999)
 Magnum Love (1999)
 All The Way In (1984)

References

External links
 
 
 
 Tell Them Bob Chinn Is Here! Bob Chinn Interview At Rock! Shock! Pop!
 Audio interview with Bob Chinn at The Rialto Report

Living people
American pornographic film directors
1943 births
American people of Chinese descent
UCLA_Film_School_alumni